Dawid Kort (born 29 April 1995) is a Polish professional footballer playing as a midfielder for ŁKS Łódź.

Club career

Sort started his career with Pogoń Szczecin.

On 3 September 2020, he signed with Odra Opole.

On 1 September 2021, Kort joined Ekstraklasa side Stal Mielec on a one-year deal.

On 9 June 2022, he moved to I liga club ŁKS Łódź, signing a two-year contract.

Career statistics

Club

References

1995 births
Sportspeople from Szczecin
Living people
Polish footballers
Poland youth international footballers
Ekstraklasa players
I liga players
III liga players
Super League Greece players
Flota Świnoujście players
Bytovia Bytów players
Pogoń Szczecin players
Wisła Kraków players
Atromitos F.C. players
Miedź Legnica players
Odra Opole players
Stal Mielec players
ŁKS Łódź players
Association football midfielders
Polish expatriate footballers
Expatriate footballers in Greece